The following is a list of the 108 municipalities (comuni) of the Metropolitan City of Messina, Sicily, Italy.

List

See also
List of municipalities of Italy

References

Messina